Nikolas Ormaetxea, also known as  Orixe (Orexa, Gipuzkoa, 6 December 1888 - Añorga, 9 October 1961) was a Basque language writer.

Works

Novels 
 Santa Cruz apaiza (1929, Leizaola)

Essays 
 Euskal literaturaren atze edo edesti laburra (1927, Euskal-Esnalea aldizkaria)
 Jainkoaren billa (1971, Gero)
 Euskal literaturaren historia laburra (2002, Utriusque Vasconiae)

Poetry 
 Eusko Olerkiak (1933, Euskaltzaleak)
 Barne-muinetan (1934, Itxaropena)
 Euskaldunak (1950, Itxaropena)
 Euskaldunak (poema eta olerki guziak) (1972, Auñamendi)
 XX. mendeko poesia kaierak - Orixe (2000, Susa): Koldo Izagirreren edizioa

Literary Journals 
 Leoi-kumea (1948, La Photolith)

Machine Translation 
 Tormesko itsu-mutilla (1929, Verdes-Atxirika)
 Mireio; Frederic Mistral (1930, Verdes-Atxirika)

Screenplays 
 Mamutxak (1962, Euskal Herria)

Short Stories 
 Quiton arrebarekin (1950–1954, Euzko-Gogoa aldizkaria)

Collections 
 Idazlan guztiak (sorkuntzazkoak) (1991, Etor)
 Orixe hautatua (2002, Hiria)

Sources 
 Azurmendi, Joxe 1976: Zer dugu Orixeren kontra?, Oñati, EFA.
 Azurmendi, Joxe 1977: Zer dugu Orixeren alde?, Oñati, EFA.
 Sudupe, Pako 2011: 50eko hamarkadako euskal literatura I. Hizkuntza eta ideologia eztabaidak, Donostia, Utriusque Vasconiae. 
 Sudupe, Pako 2011: 50eko hamarkadako euskal literatura II. Kazetaritza eta saiakera, Donostia, Utriusque Vasconiae. 
 Sudupe, Pako 2012: "Ideologia eztabaidak 50eko hamarkadan" in Alaitz Aizpuru (koord.), Euskal Herriko pentsamenduaren gida, Bilbo, UEU.

External links 

  Report about Orixe
  Nikolas Ormaetxea literaturaren zubitegian

1888 births
1961 deaths
Basque writers
People from Tolosaldea